This is a list of current Heads of Dominican Republic Missions abroad. It is up to date as of June 2020.

Resident Heads of Missions

Non-resident Heads of Missions
The Dominican Republic does not maintain a full embassy in a number of countries.  In each of these cases, the heads of Missions to another country, usually a neighbouring one, is concurrently accredited to the other country.  In most cases, a smaller, local mission provides for emergencies, and is headed up by a lesser diplomat or a member of the local Dominican community.

Heads of Missions to non-sovereign territories

Heads of Missions to International Organisations

References
 Ministerio de Relaciones Exteriores in Spanish

Dominican Republic
 
Dominican Republic diplomacy-related lists